Michelle Pettigrove is an Australian actress, well known for her role as alternate medicine nursing sister Kate Bryant in the long-running rural soap opera A Country Practice. She had appeared in the series in a guest role previously, and was brought back in 1991 to play the permanent role of new nurse Sister Bryant

Pettigrove has also appeared in several other series, including Blue Heelers, Home and Away (in 3 different roles), Something in the Air, Silversun and the mini-series Brides of Christ.

Pettigrove is married to actor and singer Frankie J. Holden, with whom she has one daughter, Georgia Rose, who appeared in the final night of blind auditions of The Voice 2022.  They both now work on travel shows, particularly those dedicated to camping and caravanning, and are part owners at Tathra Beachside (Caravan Park). She is an ambassador for ChildFund (formerly Christian Children's Fund), and sponsored a boy in  Zambia from 1997. She is now sponsoring a girl in Cambodia.

Filmography

TV Series 

 1988, Rafferty's Rules as Libby Carroll, 1 episode
 1990, Shadows of the Heart as Clara Bannet, 2 episodes
 1991, Brides of Christ as Sister Francine, 6 episodes
 1988-1994, A Country Practice as Sister Kate Bryant, Mary O'Connor, 231 episodes
 1997, Big Sky as Stacey, 1 episode
 1998, Blue Healers as Janet Shaw, 1 episode
 2001-2002, Something in the Air as Sarah Priory, 9 episodes
 2004, Silversun as Dr. Lillian Reiss, 26 episdoes

References 

Living people
Australian television actresses
Actresses from New South Wales
20th-century Australian actresses
21st-century Australian women
21st-century Australian people
1966 births